Daniel Agustin Vencu Velasquez Castro (born 1994) is a Swedish politician and member of the Riksdag, the national legislature. A member of the Social Democratic Party, he has represented Stockholm Municipality since September 2022. He is a member of the municipal council in Stockholm Municipality.

Personal life
Born in Sweden, Vencu Velasquez Castro is of Chilean descent. He is openly gay.

References

1994 births
Swedish LGBT politicians
Living people
Members of the Riksdag 2022–2026
Members of the Riksdag from the Social Democrats
People from Stockholm
Swedish people of Chilean descent
Swedish politicians of Chilean descent